Dumitru Radu Popa (born October 26, 1949) is a Romanian-born writer, essayist, translator and literary critic. In 1985, he defected to the US, asking for political asylum.

Education 
Popa obtained a Master of Arts in Romance Languages and Literature from the University of Bucharest in 1972. He obtained a Master of Science in Library and Information Science from Columbia University in 1989.

Books 
 Accidental Tourist on the New Frontier: An Introductory Guide to Global Legal Research (with Jeanne Rehberg). Littleton, CO: Rotman & Co., 1998.
 Five collections of short stories and two novels (in Romanian) (1982–2001)
 One critical essay about the French writer Antoine de Saint-Exupery (in Romanian) (1980).
 Bas-relief with Heroes. Memphis, TN: Memphis University Press, 1988 (Introductory study to Romanian poetry in English version).
 Poetry – A Scar on the Wall of Air. Introductory study and translations (with Thomas C. Carslon) in Little Bones in Winter, Selected Poems of Virgil Mazilescu. Bucharest: Romanian Cultural Foundation, 1996.
 Ut Musica Poesis. Introductory essay in Selected Poems of Mihai Eminescu. Bucharest: Univers Publishing House, 2000.
 La Naissance: structures symboliques. In Religion, Fiction, and History. Essays in Memory of loan Petru	Ed. by Sorin Antohi. Bucharest: Nemira, 2001.
 Antoine de Saint-Exupery - Aventura Constiintei (1980)
 Călătoria (1982)
 Fisura (Cartea Românescă, 1985)
 Little Bones in Winter (1996)
 Panic Syndrome! (Premiul Uniunii Scriitorilor, 1997)
 Inchide ochii (1998)
 Traversând Washington Square (1999)
 La Revoluţia Română (2000)
  (2004)
 Skenzemon! (2005)
 Lady V. (2006)
 Lady V. and Other Short Stories ([2007)]

Memberships and awards
 Member of the American Association of Law Libraries (since 1989) Member of the American Society of International Law (since 1989)
 Member of the International Association of Law Libraries (since 1989) Member of the Romanian Writers Association (since 1990)
 Executive Vice-President of ACORD (NGO for the advancement of the rule of law in Romania, 1997–2001)
 National Award for Literature (for Panic Syndrome! short stories, Bucharest: Univers, 1997)
 Order of Merit in the rank of Officer (for the advancement of the rule of law in Romania and interface with the American culture, 2000).

References

Living people
1949 births
Romanian expatriates in the United States
Romanian writers
Romanian essayists
Romanian translators
Romanian literary critics
Romanian defectors
20th-century translators
20th-century essayists
University of Bucharest alumni
Columbia University alumni